An incomplete list of the earliest films produced in Brazil between 1908 and 1919. For an A-Z list of films currently on Wikipedia, see :Category:Brazilian films

1897-1909

1910s

External links
 Brazilian films on Cinemabrasileiro.net
 Brazilian film at the Internet Movie Database

1900
Lists of 1900s films
Films
Lists of 1910s films
Films